Aurelio Andreazzoli (born 5 November 1953) is an Italian football coach. He was most recently the head coach of Serie B club Ternana.

Career

In 2005, Andreazzoli joined Roma to become head coach Luciano Spalletti's assistant coach, becoming a valuable part of the team over the years. He was relieved from his duties after Spalletti departed Roma, but was called back after two years to assist the newly appointed caretaker manager Vincenzo Montella. Andreazzoli continued to work with Luis Enrique and Zdeněk Zeman as a technique coach.

On 2 February 2013, after Zeman was relieved from his duties, Andreazzoli was appointed manager until the end of the 2012–13 season. His first win came in a 1–0 home win over Serie A leaders Juventus. On 8 April 2013, his side drew 1–1 with Lazio in his first Derby della Capitale as Roma manager. On 17 April 2013, he led Roma to the 2012–13 Coppa Italia final with a 2–3 win over Internazionale at the San Siro. On 26 May 2013, he led Roma on the most important match of his career in the competition final against intercity rivals Lazio, which Roma lost 0–1.

On 12 June 2013, Roma club president James Pallotta announced Rudi Garcia's appointment as the new manager of Roma, thereby ending Andreazzoli's spell as caretaker manager.

On 17 December 2017, he was named new head coach of Serie B promotion hopefuls Empoli in place of Vincenzo Vivarini. After a very successful season in which he guided Empoli to win the Serie B title and ensure promotion to the top flight for the 2018–19 Serie A season, his contract was extended for one more season. He was sacked on 5 November 2018. He was re-appointed by Empoli on 13 March 2019.

On 14 June 2019, Andreazzoli signed with Genoa but was sacked on 21 October with the team in second-to-last position.

On 21 June 2021, Andreazzoli agreed to return in charge of Empoli after the club's promotion to Serie A, signing a one-year contract with the Tuscans. He safely guided Empoli to a fourteenth place in the 2021–22 Serie A league and was praised for his team's performances; despite that, on 1 June 2022 Empoli announced Andreazzoli's expiring contract would not be extended.

On 2 December 2022, Andreazzoli was hired as the new head coach of Serie B club Ternana, signing a contract until 30 June 2024. On 25 February 2023, following a injury-time home loss to Cittadella, Andreazzoli tended his resignations with immediate effect.

Career statistics

Honours
Empoli
 Serie B: 2017–18

References

External links
http://www.gazzettagiallorossa.it/2013/02/gazzetta-giallorossa-ecco-chi-e-aurelio-andreazzoli
http://www.eatsleepsport.com/serie-a/andreazzoli-handed-reins-after-zeman-axe-1540144.html#.UQ5uzlcfkR8

1953 births
Living people
People from Massa
Sportspeople from the Province of Massa-Carrara
Italian football managers
F.C. Grosseto S.S.D. managers
Empoli F.C. managers
U.S. Alessandria Calcio 1912 managers
A.S. Roma managers
Genoa C.F.C. managers
Serie A managers
Serie B managers
Ternana Calcio managers